The 2008 Toray Pan Pacific Open was a women's tennis tournament played on outdoor hard courts. It was the 25th edition of the Toray Pan Pacific Open, and was part of the Tier I Series of the 2008 WTA Tour. It took place at the Ariake Coliseum in Tokyo, Japan, from September 15 through September 21, 2008. Dinara Safina won the singles title.

Champions

Singles

 Dinara Safina defeated  Svetlana Kuznetsova, 6–1, 6–3
It was Dinara Safina's 4th title of the year, and her 9th overall. It was her 3rd Tier I title of the year, and overall.

Doubles

 Vania King  /  Nadia Petrova  defeated  Lisa Raymond /   Samantha Stosur, 6–1, 6–4

References

External links
Official website
Singles, Doubles and Qualifying Singles draws

Toray Pan Pacific Open
2008
Toray Pan Pacific Open
Toray Pan Pacific Open
Toray Pan Pacific Open